Rafael Freire Luz (born February 11, 1992), commonly known as Rafa Luz, is a Brazilian-Spanish professional basketball player for MoraBanc Andorra of the LEB Oro. He is a point guard.

Early years
Rafa Luz, the brother of several international players for the Brazilian national women's team, was called up to the Brazilian national under-18 team, at the age of 15.

In October 2009, after spending two seasons with Unicaja's junior youth teams, Luz got a Spanish passport.

Professional career
Luz signed for the 2010–11 ACB season with the Spanish club Unicaja, but he ended up playing with the club's farm team, Clínicas Rincón. In March 2011, he was loaned to the Spanish club CB Granada, until the end of the season. There, he averaged 4.8 points, 1.3 rebounds, and 3.1 assists per game in the Spanish ACB League. In August 2011, Unicaja loaned him to Spanish club Lucentum Alicante. Luz averaged 5.6 points, 1.8 rebounds, and 1.7 assists per game in the 2011–12 ACB season.

In August 2012, Luz ended his contract with Unicaja Málaga, and signed a new contract with Spanish club Blu:sens Monbús Obradoiro. He played with the Galician team until 2015, when he left Spain, and returned to Brazil, after signing a new one-year deal with Flamengo of the Brazilian NBB league.

In July 2016, Luz signed a two-year deal with the Spanish club Baskonia. In July 2017, Luz split up from the Basque entity.

On July 19, 2018, Luz signed with MoraBanc Andorra of the Liga ACB. On July 16, 2019, Luz signed a two-year deal with UCAM Murcia.

On February 28, 2021, he has signed with Nevėžis Kėdainiai of the Lithuanian Basketball League.

On July 14, 2021, he has signed with Bilbao Basket of the Liga ACB.

National team career
Luz was a part of the senior men's Brazilian national basketball team that won the silver medal at the 2011 FIBA Americas Championship, which was held in Mar del Plata, Argentina. He also played at the 2013 FIBA Americas Championship, the 2015 Pan American Games, where he won a gold medal, and the 2016 Summer Olympics.

References

External links
Rafa Luz  at acb.com 
Rafa Luz at eurobasket.com
Rafa Luz at euroleague.net

1992 births
Living people
2019 FIBA Basketball World Cup players
Baloncesto Málaga players
Basketball players at the 2015 Pan American Games
Basketball players at the 2016 Summer Olympics
BC Andorra players
Expatriate basketball people in Andorra
BC Nevėžis players
Bilbao Basket players
Brazilian expatriate basketball people in Lithuania
Brazilian expatriate basketball people in Spain
Brazilian men's basketball players
CB Axarquía players
CB Granada players
CB Lucentum Alicante players
CB Murcia players
Flamengo basketball players
Liga ACB players
Medalists at the 2015 Pan American Games
Novo Basquete Brasil players
Obradoiro CAB players
Olympic basketball players of Brazil
Pan American Games gold medalists for Brazil
Pan American Games medalists in basketball
People from Araçatuba
Point guards
Saski Baskonia players
Sportspeople from São Paulo (state)